The Ulster Conservatives and Unionists, officially registered as the Ulster Conservatives and Unionists – New Force (UCUNF), was an electoral alliance in Northern Ireland between the Ulster Unionist Party (UUP) and the Conservative Party.

2009 European Parliament campaign
The alliance was launched in 2009. Conservatives and Unionists candidates were first selected for the 2009 European Parliament election. The first candidate to stand for election using this description was Ulster Unionist Jim Nicholson, who polled 82,893 votes, 17.0% of the total, and was elected as a Member of the European Parliament (MEP).

2010 UK general election campaign

On 24 February 2010, the alliance announced 9 of the 18 candidates who were to run in the 2010 United Kingdom general election. The UUP's sole Member of Parliament (MP) from the 2005 general election, Sylvia, Lady Hermon for North Down, had expressed public dissatisfaction with the arrangement since early 2009, and left the UUP in March 2010, deciding to contest the forthcoming general election as an Independent. As such, the alliance had no incumbent MPs. On 7 April 2010 the candidate for Fermanagh and South Tyrone, Tom Elliott, withdrew in favour of Independent Rodney Connor, leaving that constituency without a Unionist Party candidate.

The Conservative and UUP alliance failed to gain any seats in the election. The UUP lost their only seat in North Down to Hermon's independent campaign, and Connor also lost Fermanagh and South Tyrone. Across Northern Ireland, the joint share of the vote was 15.2%.

End of the alliance
After failed calls for the UUP to disband and join the Conservatives, the Conservatives in Northern Ireland were relaunched as NI Conservatives on 14 June 2012.

Electoral results

European Parliament

Westminster

Stormont

Footnotes

External links
Vote for Change – Conservatives and Unionists

2009 establishments in Northern Ireland
Conservative parties in Ireland
Defunct political parties in Northern Ireland
Defunct political party alliances in the United Kingdom
History of the Conservative Party (UK)
Organisation of the Conservative Party (UK)
Political parties established in 2009
Political party alliances in Ireland
Politics of Northern Ireland
Ulster Unionist Party